Nogaylar is a village in the Nurdağı District, Gaziantep Province, Turkey. The village is inhabited by Yörüks, Nogais and Karachays, and had a population of 430 in 2022.

History
The village was founded by 90 families of Nogais in 1865. However, they later suffered an epidemic of malaria, and much of those who survived left for the villages near Kayseri. Only two Nogai families remained.

References

Villages in Nurdağı District